Scaeosopha trigonia is a species of moth of the family Cosmopterigidae. It is found on Sulawesi, an island in Indonesia.

The wingspan is about 14.5 mm. The ground colour of the forewings is yellowish-white, overlaid with black and pale yellowish-brown spots and patches. The hindwings are yellowish-brown.

Etymology
The species name refers to the triangular process at the basal third of the uncus brachium and is derived from Latin trigonius (meaning triangular).

References

Moths described in 2012
Scaeosophinae